The Chen family-style (陳家、陳氏、陳式 太極拳) or Chen-style Taijiquan is a Northern Chinese martial art and the original form of Taiji. Chen-style is characterized by silk reeling (纏絲勁; chán sī jìn), alternating fast and slow motions, and bursts of power (發勁; fa jin).

Traditionally, Taijiquan is practiced as a martial art but has expanded into other domains of practice such as health or performances. Some argue that Chen Style Taijiquan has preserved and emphasized the martial efficacy to a greater extent.

History

Origin theories 
As for the origin and nature of modern Chen-style taijiquan, documents from the 17th century indicate the Chen clan settled in Chenjiagou (Chen Village, 陳家溝), Henan province, in the 13th century and reveal the defining contribution of Chen Wangting (陈王庭; 1580–1660). It is therefore not clear how the Chen family actually came to practise their unique martial style and contradictory "histories" abound. What is known is that the other four contemporary traditional Taijiquan styles (Yang, Sun, Wu and Wu (Hao)) trace their teachings back to Chen village in the early 1800s.

Chen Village (Chenjiagou) 
According to Chen Village family history, Chen Bu (陳仆; 陈卜) was a skilled martial artist who started the martial arts tradition within Chen Village. The Chen family were originally from Hong Dong (洪洞), Shanxi (山西). Chen Bu, considered to be the founder of the village, moved from Shanxi to Wen County (溫县), Henan Province (河南) in 1374. The new area was originally known as Chang Yang Cun (常陽村) or Sunshine village and grew to include a large number of Chen descendants. Because of the three deep ravines (Gou) beside the village it came to be known as Chen Jia Gou (陳家溝) or Chen Family creek / brook. For generations onwards, the Chen Village was known for their martial arts.

The special nature of Tai Chi Chuan practice was attributed to the ninth generation Chen Village leader, Chen Wangting (陳王廷; 陈王庭; 1580–1660). He codified pre-existing Chen training practice into a corpus of seven routines. This included five routines of tai chi chuan (太極拳五路), 108 form Long Fist (一百零八勢長拳) and a more rigorous routine known as Cannon Fist (炮捶一路). Chen Wangting integrated different elements of Chinese philosophy into the martial arts training to create a new approach that we now recognize as the Internal martial arts. He added the principles of Yin-Yang theory (阴阳; the universal principle of complementary opposites), the techniques of Daoyin (leading and guiding energy), Tui na (expelling and drawing energy), the Chinese medical theory of energy (气功) and Chinese medical theory of the meridians (经络).  Those theories encountered in Classical Chinese Medicine and described in such texts as the Huang Di Nei Jing (《黃帝內經》; Yellow Emperor's Canon of Chinese Medicine). In addition, Wangting incorporated the boxing theories from sixteen different martial art styles as described in the classic text, Ji Xiao Xin Shu(繼效新書; "New Book Recording Effective Techniques"; ~ 1559–1561) written by the Ming General Qi Jiguang (戚繼光; 1528–1588).

Chen Changxing (陳長興 Chén Chángxīng, Ch'en Chang-hsing, 1771–1853), 14th generation Chen Village martial artist, synthesized Chen Wangting's open fist training corpus into two routines that came to be known as "Old Frame" (老架; lao jia). Those two routines are named individually as the First Form (Yilu; 一路) and the Second Form (Erlu; 二路, more commonly known as the Cannon Fist 炮捶). Chen Changxing, contrary to Chen family tradition, also took the first recorded non-family member as a disciple, Yang Luchan (1799–1871), who went on to popularize the art throughout China, but as his own family tradition known as Yang-style tai ji quan. The Chen family system was only taught within the Chen village region until 1928.

Chen Youben (陳有本; 1780–1858), also of the 14th Chen generation, is credited with starting another Chen training tradition. This system also based on two routines is known as "Small Frame" (xiao jia; 小架). Small Frame system of training eventually lead to the formation of two other styles of Tai chi chuan that show strong Chen family influences, Zhaobao jia (趙堡架) and Hulei jia (Thunder style; 忽雷架). However they are not considered a part of the Chen family lineage.

Other origin stories 
Some legends assert that a disciple of Zhang Sanfeng named Wang Zongyue (王宗岳) taught Chen family the martial art later to be known as taijiquan.

He is said to have helped transform the Chen family art with Chen Wangting (1580–1660) by emphasizing internal fighting practices. However, there are significant difficulties with this explanation, as it is no longer clear if their relationship was that of teacher/student or even who taught whom.

Recent History
The availability and popularity of Chen-style Taijiquan is reflective of the radical changes that occurred within Chinese society during the 20th century. In the decline of the Qing Dynasty, the emergence of a Republican government and the policies of the People's Republic of China, Chen Tai Ji Quan underwent a period of discovery, popularization, and finally internationalization.

During the second half of the 19th century, Yang Luchan (杨露禅; 1799–1872) and his family established a reputation of Yang-style t'ai chi ch'uan throughout the Qing empire.  Few people knew that Yang Luchan first learned his martial arts from Chen Changxing in the Chen Village. Fewer people still visited the Chen village to improve their understanding of Tai Chi Chuan. Only Wu Yu-hsiang (武禹襄; 1812–1880), a student of Yang Luchan and the eventual founder of Wu (Hao)-style t'ai chi ch'uan (武/郝氏), was known to have briefly studied the Chen Family small frame system under Chen Qingping (陳清平 1795–1868). This situation changed with the fall of the Qing empire when Chinese sought to discover and improve their understanding of traditional philosophies and methods.

In 1928, Chen Zhaopei (陈照丕; 1893–1972) and later his uncle, Chen Fake (陳發科, 陈发科, Chén Fākē, 1887–1957) moved from Chen village to teach in Beijing. Their Chen-style practice was initially perceived as radically different from other prevalent martial art schools (including established tai chi "traditions") of the time. Chen Fake proved the effectiveness of Chen-style t'ai chi ch'uan through various private challenges and even a series of Lei tai matches. Within a short time, the Beijing martial arts community was convinced of the effectiveness of Chen-style t'ai chi ch'uan and a large group of martial enthusiasts started to train and publicly promote it.

The increased interest in Chen-style t'ai chi ch'uan led Tang Hao (唐豪; 1887–1959), one of the first modern Chinese martial art historians, to visit and document the martial lineage in Chen Village in 1930 with Chen Ziming. During the course of his research, he consulted with a manuscript written by 16th generation family member Chen Xin (陳鑫; Ch'en Hsin; 1849–1929) detailing Chen Xin's understanding of the Chen Village heritage. Chen Xin's nephew, Chen Chunyuan, together with Chen Panling (president of Henan Province Martial Arts Academy), Han Zibu (president of Henan Archives Bureau), Wang Zemin, Bai Yusheng of Kaiming Publishing House, Guan Baiyi (director of Henan Provincial Museum) and Zhang Jiamou helped publish Chen Xin's work posthumously.  The book entitled Chen Style Taijiquan Illustrated and Explained (太極拳圖說 see classic book) was published in 1933 with the first print run of thousand copies.

For nearly thirty years, until his death in 1958, Chen Fake diligently taught the art of Chen-style t'ai chi ch'uan to a select group of students. As a result, a strong Beijing Chen-style tradition centered around his "New Frame" variant of Chen Village "Old Frame" survived after his death. His legacy was spread throughout China by the efforts of his senior students.

The Cultural Revolution (1966–1976) resulted in a period of Chen-style t'ai chi ch'uan decline. The Chinese government engaged in an active policy to suppress all traditional teachings, including the practice of martial arts. Training facilities were closed and practitioners were prosecuted. Many Chen masters were publicly denounced. For example, Chen Zhao Pei was pushed to the point of attempting suicide, and Hong Junsheng was left malnourished. To the great credit of the Chen-style practitioners at that time, training was continued in secret and at great personal risk ensuring the continuation of the tradition.

During the Era of Reconstruction (1976–1989), the policy of repression of traditional Chinese culture was reversed. Under this new climate, Chen tai chi chuan was once again allowed to be practiced openly.  Through a series of government-sponsored meetings and various provincial and national tournaments, Chen-style taiji regained its reputation as an important branch of Chinese martial arts. In addition, those meetings created a new generation of Chen-style teachers.
 
The start of the internationalisation of Chen-style can be traced to 1981. A t'ai chi ch'uan association from Japan went on a promotional tour to the Chen village. The success of this trip created interest in Chen-style t'ai chi ch'uan both nationally and internationally. Soon t'ai chi ch'uan enthusiasts from other countries started their pilgrimage to Chenjiagou. The increasing interest led all levels of the Chinese governments to improve the infrastructure and support of Chen Jia Gou including the establishment of martial art schools, hotels and tourist associations.

In 1983, martial artists from the Chen village received full government support to promote Chen tai chi chuan abroad. Some of the best Chen stylists became international "roaming ambassadors" known as the "Four Buddha Warrior Attendants". Those four Chen stylists including Chen Xiaowang (陳小旺; Chen Fake's direct grandson), Chen Zhenglei (陈正雷; 1949–), Wang Xian (王西安) and Zhu Tiancai (朱天才) traveled relentlessly giving global workshops and creating an international group of Chen-style practitioners.

Other well known Chen teachers active in China or overseas include:
 Dr. Wang Xiaojun (王晓军, 1968). He is disciple of masters Tian Qiutian, Dr. Li Yongchang and Mei Mosheng. Dr. Wang is teacher of Taiji Quan, Qigong and TCM in Beijing Sports University and other cities of the World, and he is one of the more representative masters of Beijing Branch.
 Félix Castellanos (disciple of Dr. Wang Xiaojun). He is a reference of Chen Beijing branch in Spain.
Chen Yu (陳瑜; grandson of Chen Fake)
 Tian Jianhua (田剑华; the last living student of Chen Fake, younger brother of Tian Xiuchen, teaching in Beijing)
 Li Enjiu (李恩久; disciple of Hong Junsheng)
 Zhang Xuexin (張學信; disciple of Feng Zhiqiang; teaching in the US),
 Han Kuiyuan (韩奎元; 1948-), disciple of both Tian Xiuchen and Feng Zhiqiang. He is teaching in Hungary.
 Zhang Zhijun (張志俊),
 Cheng Jincai (程進才; disciple of Chen Zhaokui; The founder of International Chen Style Tai Chi Development Center, Houston, TX),
 Joseph Chen Zhonghua (陳中華; disciple of Hong Junsheng and Feng Zhiqiang; teaching throughout North America),
 Wu (Peter) Shi-zeng (吴仕增; a student of Hong Junsheng in Australia)
Chen Bing (陳炳; Chen Village)
Chen Xiaoxing (陳小星; Chen Village)
Chen Peishan (陳沛山) and Chen Peiju (陳沛匊) have been influential in promoting the less-known Chen Village Small Frame tradition
 Chen Huixian (陈会贤; Disciple of Chen Zhenglei teaching in the US)
 Chou Wenpei (周文沛; Berkeley, California): Student of 潘詠周. Promote and Document Chen-style taijiquan since 1996
 Chen Wencheng (陈文城; Disciple of Chen Zhenglei teaching in Los Angeles US)
 Jesse Tsao (曹鳳山; Disciple of Chen Zhenglei, based in San Diego US, teaching internationally. Hosting and assisting workshops of Chen Xiaowang, Chen Zhenlei, Zhu Tiancai, Chen Xiaoxing since 1999.  http://www.taichihealthways.com/ )
Chen Boxiang (陈伯祥; Chen Village)

In recent decades Chen-style taijiquan has come to be recognized as a major style of martial art within China. In Western countries Chen-style is rapidly growing in popularity for either martial art (interest in its neijia skills) or healthy life-style (more lively than Yang style) reasons.

Chen-style schools with links back to Chen Village and Beijing have blossomed rapidly in Western countries in the last twenty years—offering a significantly different alternative to Yang family style (effectively the only tai chi known in the West before that time). Such countries with strong links back to Chen Village include the US, Canada, Britain, New Zealand, Germany, Italy, Czech Republic, Japan, Singapore and Malaysia.

Tai ji quan lineage tree with Chen-style focus 

The story of Chen-style Taiji is rich and complex.  The lineage tree is a concise summary and highlights some of the important personalities that contributed to its history.  However, there are some missing details that can provide insight to the current understanding of this art.

Chen Xin (1849-1929), 8th generation Chen family member, provided one of the most important written description of the Chen style. He was the grandson of Chen Youshen (陈有恒), 6th generation Chen family member.  Chen Youshen was the brother of Chen Youben (陈有本), the creator of Small Frame.  Chen Xin's father was Chen Zhongshen and Chen Xin's uncle, Chen Jishen were twins.  In that 7th generation Chen family, Chen Zhongshen, Chen Jishen, Chen Gengyun (陈耕耘, the son of Chen Chanxing), Yang Luchan (杨露禅, founder of Yang Style) and Chen Qingping(陈清萍, promoter of Zhaobao style Tai chi ch'uan) were all martial artists with exceptional abilities.

Chen Xin initially trained with his father but his father ordered him to study literature rather than the martial arts.  It was only later that he decided to use his literature skills to describe his understanding of the secrets of Chen style.  In Chen Xin's generation, his older brother, Chen Yao and his cousin, Chen Yanxi (陈延熙, father of Chen Fake) were considered masters of the Chen style.  Chen Xin's legacy is his book and his student, Chen Ziming (陈子明).  Chen Ziming, went on to promote Chen style small frame throughout China and wrote books promoting the art.  Chen Ziming was in the same generation as Chen Fake.

Forms 
Forms, also called Taolu (Chinese: 套路, tàolù: routine, pattern, standard method), derived from the Chinese term for "exercise set" in wushu, are series of choreographed movements that serve as repositories of various methods, techniques, stances, and types of energy and force production. They are a key training method in traditional Chinese martial arts. All Chen Style Taijiquan traditions have at least two forms: Yi Lu (First Road) and Er Lu (Second Road),

Within the Chen Style Taijiquan umbrella, there are various teaching traditions, and their practices may often vary somewhat from one another - often due to differences in how they cultivated their skill throughout their decades of practice. Chen Ziming wrote, "In the beginning of the training, conform to patterns. At an intermediate level, you may change patterns. Then finally, patterns are driven by spirit.” Over time and distance within Chen style, the resulting interpretations created subdivisions. Each variation is due to its history and the particular training insights of master teachers. Currently, the subdivisions of Chen style Taijiquan include: Historical training methods from Chen Village; forms derived from the lineage of Chen Fake commonly known as Big, or Large, Frame: Old Frame and New Frame; Chen family Small Frame; training methods from Chen Fake's students, such as Tian Xiuchen, Feng Zhiqiang and Hong Junsheng; and closely related traditions, such as Zhaobao Taijiquan (趙堡太極拳).

In the past, the efficacy of a training method was determined through actual combat. In the modern era, such tests of skill no longer take place. There also are no recognized central authorities for Taijiquan. This led to the determination of authenticity for any style depending on anecdotal stories or appeal to historical lineage. Chen Taijiquan also follows this trend for the most part.

The Chen style practitioner, however, follows a more stringent requirement. According to Chen Fake (1887-1957), the last great proponent of the Chen style in the modern era, the external appearance of the form is not important. Each movement is based on intricate theories unique to this system. A correct Chen style Taijiquan form should be based on the same fundamental principle and each element of a form should have a purpose. In Chen Fake's words: "This set of Taijiquan does not have one technique which is useless. Everything was carefully designed for a purpose." ("这套拳没有一个 动作是空的, 都是有用的")

The understanding of each subdivision should be interpreted with these ideas in mind.

The fundamental principles for Chen style taijiquan are summarized as follows:

 Keep the head suspended from above (虚领顶劲, xū lǐng dǐng jìn)
 Keep the body centered and upright  (立身中正, lìshēn zhōngzhèng)
 Loosen the shoulders and sink the elbows (松肩沉肘, sōng jiān chén zhǒu)
 Hollow the chest and settle the waist (含胸塌腰, hán xiōng tā yāo)
 Drop the heart/mind energy [to the dantian] (心气下降, xīn qì xià jiàng)
 Breathe naturally (呼吸自然, hū xī zì rán)
 Loosen the hips and keep the knees bent (松胯屈膝, sōng kuà qū xī)
 The crotch is arch shaped (裆劲开圆, dāng jìn kāi yuán)
 Empty and solid separate clearly (虚实分明, xū shí fēn míng)
 The top and bottom coordinate (上下相随. shàng xià xiāng suí)
 Hardness and softness facilitate each other (刚柔相济, gāng róu xiāng jì)
 Fast and slow alternate (快慢相间, (kuài màn xiāng jiàn)
 The external shape travels a curve; (外形走弧线, wài xíng zǒu hú xiàn)
 The internal energy travels a spiral path (内劲走螺旋, nèi jìn zǒu luó xuán)
 The body leads the hand (以身领手, yǐ shēn lǐng shǒu)
 The back waist is an axis (以腰为轴, yǐ yāo wèi zhóu)

Historical forms from Chen Village 
Historical forms refers to training methods that are described in traditional boxing manuals from Chen village or through oral recollections or through verbal histories.

Chen Wangting (陳王廷; 陈王庭; 1580–1660), ninth generation Chen Village leader, was credited with the creation of seven routines. Those routines were:
 The First Set of Thirteen Movements with 66 Forms (头套十三式 66式)
 The Second Set with 27 forms (二套 27式)
 The Third Set with 24 forms also known as the Four Big Hammer Set (三套24式 又称大四套捶)
 Red Fist with 23 forms (红拳 23式)
 The Fifth Set with 29 forms (五套29式)
 The Long Fist with 108 forms (长拳 108式)
 The Cannon Fist with 71 forms now commonly known as the Second Form, Erlu (炮捶 俗称二路71式)
 Weapon forms including the broadsword, the sword, the staff and the hook (器械 刀, 枪, 棍, 钩等多种)
 Two man training routines (对练套路)

The first five sets were a curriculum known as the five routines of taijiquan (太極拳五路). The 108-form Long Fist (Boxing) (一百零八勢長拳, Yībǎi líng bā shì zhǎngquán) and a form known as Cannon Fist (Pounding) (炮捶, Pào chuí) were considered to be a separate curriculum.

Most of these forms were not commonly practiced after the time of Chen Changxing (陳長興, 1771–1853) and Chen Youben (陳有本, 1780–1858) of the 14th generation. Around that time, the curriculum was streamlined into two forms representing the two paths of curricula, the Yilu, the First Path, or Road, trained by the Thirteen Movements (十三势, Shísān shì) form, and the Erlu, the Second Path, trained by the Cannon Fist (炮捶, Pào chuí) form.

In order to preserve it, Chen Xin (1849-1929) recorded the 66-movement Thirteen Postures (十三势) form as it was passed to him in his book, Chen Family Taijiquan Illustrated and Explained (陳氏太極拳圖說, Chén shì tàijí quán túshuō).

Push hands as a means of training was not mentioned in the Chen historical manuals, rather it was described as a form of pair training. From a military perspective, empty-hand training was a foundation for weapons training and push hands training was a method to prevail in the bind (two weapons locked or pressed against each other).  In terms of weapons, the Chen clan writings described a variety of weapons training including: spear, staff, swords, halberd, mace, and sickles, but the manuals specifically described training for spear (枪, qiāng), staff (棍, gùn), broadsword (saber)(刀, dāo), and straight sword (剑, jiàn).

Existing Chen Village Forms

Two-Path Curriculum 
Today, the two-path curriculum is the basis of training for all branches of Chen-style taijiquan. Each path is generally trained by a single form, known simply as the First Form (Yi Lu), less commonly called, the Thirteen Movements (十三势, Shísān shì), and the Second Form (Er Lu), also called Cannon Fist (炮捶, Pào Chuí). Each path takes a contrasting approach to training.

The Yilu begins to train the student in principles specific to Taijiquan. It focuses on the essentials of steps, stances, and movement; internal development including silk reeling training; how to use the mind to engage the body to move oneself according to Taijiquan principles. The method of training application on this path, push hands, teaches how to control an opponent through yielding, attaching, redirection, manipulation, grappling, breaking structure and other skills to render the opponent unable to counterattack effectively when martial and weapon techniques are used later in training. Push hands has evolved over time from training to test and improve the proper usage of taijiquan to a contest between practitioners to a form of sport fighting mostly divorced from its roots in taijiquan.

Erlu (Second Path) training usually starts after the student is proficient in Yilu. Erlu focuses on expressing the internal skills cultivated during Yilu training; its applications contain more striking, jumping, lunging, and more athletic movements. Whereas in Yilu, the body was used to lead the hand (以身领手, yǐ shēn lǐng shǒu), in Erlu, the hand is used to lead the body (以手领身, yǐ shǒu lǐng shēn). In appearance, Erlu form is often executed faster and is more explosive than the Yilu. The intent is focused on defending one’s life, so each posture is training for a strike or break rather than a grapple and the technique uses the energies of smaller and smaller circles. Although the Cannon Fist form, is accurately taught in many traditions, very few teach Erlu self-defense skills, and then, usually only to a few trusted students. In some training traditions today, both forms may be used to train each curriculum path.

Frames - Large and Small, Old and New 
Within the Chen Family, there are three main variants (frames) of Chen forms that are being practiced today. Each is a perspective of the Chen Taijiquan tradition. The martial art concept of frames (架, jià, frame, rack, framework) referred to the general width of stances and range of motion within the form. Applied to Chen taijiquan, for example, Large Frame (大架, Dà jià ), the standard horse stance is at least two and half shoulder widths wide and hand techniques are large and expansive in appearance. By contrast, in Small Frame (小架, Xiǎo jià), the standard horse stance is two shoulders width wide and the hand techniques are perceived as generally shorter and more compact. In actuality, each frame in Chen taijiquan has its own distinct lineage and develops its own training ideas. Despite clear variations, the frames of Chen Taijiquan have more in common than they have differences, but the differences are informative. Large Frame may be further divided: Old Frame (老架, Lǎo jia) taught in the Chen Village by Chen Zhaopei and New Frame (新架, Xīn jià) taught in the Chen Village by Chen Zhaokui. Both teachers of Large Frame were students of Chen Fake.

Subdivisions in Chen taijiquan are a fairly recent development. Prior to 1958, there were differences in the way teachers of different lineages taught, but there were no formal subdivisions or frames. Despite neat, discrete lineage charts, there are a number of students known to have trained with multiple teachers often without regard to lineage. Chen Zhaopei, as just one example, studied with his father, Chen Dengke, his father's uncle, Chen Yanxi, and Yanxi's son, Chen Fake, all now considered Large Frame practitioners, but he also studied theory with Chen Xin, now considered a Small Frame practitioner.

Large Frame: Old Frame (Laojia) tradition 
In 1958, Chen Zhaopei (陈照丕, 1893-1972) returned to visit the Chen Village. There, he found that war, hardship, and migration had reduced Chen Style practitioners still teaching in the Village to a couple of aging teachers with a handful of students. He immediately took early retirement and returned to the hardships of village life in order to ensure the survival of his family martial art. His teachings are known today as Laojia (Old Frame).

In Laojia, there are 72 moves in the First Form and 42 moves in the Second Form. Chen Zhaopei recorded photographs of his First Form with instructions in a book, General Explanations of Taiji Boxing Fundamentals (太極拳學入門總解, Tàijí quán xué rùmén zǒng jiě) published in 1930.

The description of Yilu in Chen style parlance are: Movements are large and stretching, Footwork is brisk and steady, the body is naturally straight, the entire body controlled by internal energy. (拳架舒展大方，步法轻灵稳健，身法中正自然，内劲统领全身。) The exercise requires the close coordination between mind-intent, internal energy, and the body; the outer appearance is an arc and the internal energy travels along the path of a spiral; the energy winds around so that the external action appears soft but corresponding internal action is hard. (练习时，要求意、气、身密切配合，外形走弧线，内劲走螺旋，缠绕圆转，外柔内刚。) In Chenjiagou, the Laojia is considered the foundation form. Because it is steady, fluid, and readily comprehended, it is always taught first.

Large Frame: New frame (Xinjia) tradition 

After Chen Zhaopei's death, taijiquan practitioners in Chen Village petitioned Chen Zhaokui (陈照奎, 1928 – 1981), Chen Fake's only living son, to come and continue their education in the art. When Chen Zhaokui visited Chen Village to assist and later succeed Chen Zhaopei in training a new generation of practitioners, (e.g. the "Four Jingang," aka the "Four Tigers": Chen Xiaowang (陈小旺), Chen Zhenglei (陈正雷), Wang Xi'an (王西安), and Zhu Tiancai (朱天才)), he taught Chen Fake's practice methods that were unfamiliar to them. He made three separate visits, totalling under two years. Zhu Tian Cai, who was a young man at the time, claimed that they all started calling it "Xinjia" (New Frame) because it seemed adapted from the teachings they had previously learned from Chen Zhaopei, which they called “Laojia” (Old Frame).

Now, it is officially called Xinjia (新架, New Frame) which represents what Chen Zhaopei's students were able to learn from Chen Zhaokui's three separate visits.

In Xinjia, there are 83 moves in the First Form and 71 moves in Second Form. Chen Xiaoxing, Chen Xiaowang’s brother and a student of Chen Zhaokui, said the primary differences between the Xinjia and Laojia are the small circles, which highlight the turning of the wrists and make visible the folding of the chest and waist. Xiongyao zhedie (chest and waist layered folding) is the coordinated opening and closing of back and chest along with a type of rippling wave (folding) running vertically up and down the dantian/waist area, connected to twisting of the waist/torso. Rotations of the waist and dantian become more apparent in Xinjia.

It was also recounted that by the time of the Cultural Revolution, Chen Village was losing qualified teachers of Taijiquan, and the resident students, who are now the more famous exponents of the style, had not been taught much in the areas of tuishou (push hands) nor martial application methods. It was not until the return of Chen Zhaokui that these methods were covered in detail, over a series of visits. Chen Zhaokui's teaching of the Xinjia was explicitly practiced with the purpose of developing tangible and effective martial arts methods and strengths. This is another reason it was said to be exciting for younger students. Since Xinjia focuses on applications, spiral energy usage, fajin (energy release) and qinna (joint locking) movements are developed. The stances tend to be more compact in the goal of better mobility for fighting applications, while they still remain quite low. This includes more dynamic, springing and jumping movements. This form tends to emphasize manipulation, seizing and grappling (qin na) and a tight method of spiral winding for both long and shorter range striking. Zhu Tian Cai has commented that the Xinjia emphasizes the silk reeling (纏絲; chán sī) movements to help beginners more easily learn the internal principles in form and to make application more obvious in relation to the Old Frame forms. The New Frame Cannon Fist is generally performed faster than other empty hand forms.

Chen Xiaoxing also emphasized that "the fundamental principles of the two frames, (Laojia and Xinjia), are the same with regards to postural requirements and movement principles.  Both require the practitioner to exhibit movements that are continuous, round and pliant, connecting all movements section by section and closely synchronising the actions of the upper and lower body....The Old and New Frames should not be viewed as different entities because both are foundation forms. If you look beyond the superficial differences, the Old Frame and New Frame are the same style, sharing the same origin and guiding principles. In Chenjiagou, people have the advantage of knowing both the first routines." However, because of common fundamentals and training methods, either frame, Laojia or Xinjia, can be trained as a complete curriculum.

As Laojia and Xinjia were coined under Chen Zhaopei's students, they are not often used in other lineages.

Small frame tradition 
Although the Small Frame (小架, Xiǎo jià) was the last subdivision from the Chen Family martial art to become internationally known, it is the frame that most resembles both the 66-movement form illustrated in Chen Xin's (陈鑫, 1849-1929) tome on taijiquan theory and practices, Chen Family Taijiquan Illustrated and Explained (陳氏太極拳圖說, Chén shì tàijí quán túshuō)  published posthumously in 1933 and the photographed form of his student, Chen Ziming (陳子明, d.:1951), in Inherited Chen Family Taiji Boxing Art’’ (1932).

The name, nature, and teachings of this Chen subdivision has been fraught with confusion for nearly a century. Describing the ancestry of his art from Chen Wangting to himself, Chen Ziming referred to practice changes in the Chen Village that separated the art into "old frame" (laojia) and "new frame" (xinjia). He said his book presented the new frame of Chen taijiquan. This was the first published reference dividing Chen Taijiquan into frames, and contemporary books, even one by his teacher, Chen Xin, did not mention frames. Although the art pragmatically tended to be taught among close relatives, there was little or no formal distinction between lineages or branches of teaching methods within the Chen Village, rather Chen Ziming's descriptions match the historical condensation of Chen Wangting's seven-form curriculum into the two-form teaching method begun in the prior century. Tang Hao reaffirmed at some length in the postscript of the same book that by "old frame" Chen was referring to the original curriculum of Chen Wangting.

However, Tang and Chen also created confusion. Tang affirmed Chen Wangting as the creator of the original, old frame forms, and he even found mention of three “forgotten" old frame forms recorded in a Chen Family Manual. Despite this, he had yet to grasp the nature of the paradigm shift within the Chen family that caused these old forms to be left behind while preserving Chen Wangting's teachings through the practice of only two old, perhaps updated, forms, the Thirteen Postures and Cannon Fist.  Moreover, Tang observed differences between Chen Ziming's Yilu and the Yilu Tang had learned from Chen Fake and with his formative information, assumed these differences to be of archaic origin. Since Ziming called his art "new frame,” and Chen Fake did not, it must have been "old frame."  Tang further concluded that the "new frame" must have been created by Chen Youben, Ziming's progenitor. Chen Fake's progenitor, Chen Changxing, must have practiced "old frame" and taught it to Yang Luchan. Regardless of the veracity of his assumptions or reasoning, Tang divided the Chen Family martial art and created three frames out of two. Since then, compelling evidence has led to more complete theories, but confusion persists.

Further, because of Chen Ziming's use of terms, "old frame" and "new frame", coupled with the modern Chen family usage of "Old Frame" and "New Frame" to describe the forms taught in the Chen Village by Chen Zhaopei and Chen Zhaokui, respectively, this has become a further source of confusion for modern students, writers, and even some historical scholars. Even today, some people confuse Chen Zhaopei’s forms called Old Frame (Laojia) by his students with Chen Wangting’s system, and Chen Fake's routines taught by his son, Chen Zhaokui, New Frame (Xinjia), with the small frame tradition and believe Chen Fake revealed the secret teaching of small frame tradition as well.

The use of "frames" was an attempt by scholars in the late 1930s to classify the growing number of taijiquan styles by size of stance and other criteria. and this became a common practice by the 1950s. They classified, two well-known traditions, Chen Fake's taijiquan as Large Frame and Wu Yuxiang's as Small Frame. So, the Chen Small Frame (Xiaojia) tradition got its name partly by de facto being different from publicly known Chen forms. And partly because Chen Qingping was one of Wu Yuxiang's teachers, so his lineage too must be small frame. To relieve confusion for the new students, the Chen Family divided their Taijiquan into Large Frame (大架, Dà jià ) and Small Frame (小架, Xiǎo jià), and other historical changes were all but forgotten.

In the Xiaojia, there are 78 moves in the First Form and 50 moves in the Second Form. And, some lineages teach additional forms that may date back to Chen Wangting's original system. Xiaojia is known mainly for encouraging students to seek to internalize spiral movements while practicing the form. Most spiral “silk reeling" (纏絲; chán sī) action is within the body. The limbs are the last place the motion occurs. Stances seem smaller because the feet do not turn outward in order to maintain a rounded crotch, the front hip is allowed to fold, and the pelvis is not forced forward. The palms must stay below the eyebrows and may not cross the center line of the torso. The body is constrained from shifting left and right horizontally except when stepping. Fajin may be expressed, but it is more calm.

Zhu Tian Cai commented that small frame tradition routines also used to be practiced by "retired" Chen villagers. The Xiaojia forms can be practiced with less of the demanding leaping, stomping, low stances, and intensive fajing of the advanced Big Frame tradition routines. Form movements emphasized use of the more subtle internal skills, which was a more appropriate regimen for the bodies of elderly practitioners. He also observed that young children used to imitate Small Frame routines by watching older villagers practicing, and this was encouraged for health reasons.

Despite its growing international recognition, authentic Xiaojia instructors are still rare, especially internationally. However, this is beginning to change, and there is a growing body of online and video material available.

Closely-related Chen traditions

Chen Taijiquan Beijing Branch
After Chen Fake’s death, his students began passing on what they had learned to their own students. These “teachers” and their students collectively are referred to as the Beijing Branch. The Beijing forms are similar to those called Xinjia (New Frame, 新架) by Chen Zhaokui's students in Chen Village. They are attributed to Chen Fake, and some regard him as the originator of the branch.

When Chen Zhaokui (Chen Fake' son) returned to Chenjiagou (Chen Village), he taught Chen Fake's form. The unfamiliar teachings became coined as "Xinjia" (New Frame), because they seemed adapted from the earlier frame they had learned, which they then called Old Frame (Laojia). Because of this distinction, Chen Fake's disciples in Beijing decided to name their master's style "Beijing Chen Style" to differentiate it from Chenjiagou Xinjia, and they considered the 1st generation as Chen Fake (17th generation member of Chen clan and 9th generation Grandmaster of Chen-style taijiquan). This means that the Beijing disciples of Chen Fake continued the Chen style taijiquan master-lineage (10th, 11th, 12th, 13th generation, etc...), but they usually start counting from Chen Fake.

Important for the diffusion of this style was Tian Xiuchen (田秀臣; 1917–1984; 10th generation master of Chen style taijiquan and 2nd generation master of Beijing Chen style taijiquan), the disciple that learned Chen style with Chen Fake for the longest continuous time. He introduced Taijiquan teaching in Chinese universities. The lineage of this branch continued with masters Tian Qiutian, Tian Qiumao and Tian Qiuxin (11th generation Chen style and 3rd generation Beijing Chen Style).

In the present day, we can know Tian Qiutian's disciples: Pan Ying, Bai Shuping and Wang Xiaojun (4th generation). Wang Xiaojun is a national Wushu referee of China and a graduate supervisor of Beijing Sport University (BSU). He has a PhD in Taiji Quan studies, he is President of National Traditional Chinese Exercise Medicine Institute, after serving as Director of Wushu Department of BSU. He is also a member of Chinese Wushu Association and a director of China Association of Research and Development on Traditional Chinese Medicine.

Han Kuiyuan (11th generation master of Chen-style taijiquan and 3rd generation master of Beijing Chen style taijiquan) is also a recognized disciple of Tian Xiuchen. After the death of Tian Xiuchen, he became a disciple of Feng Zhiqiang. He has been promoting the Beijing Chen style in Hungary since 1997.

Another notable Beijing master is Chen Yu (19th generation member of Chen clan and 11th generation master of Chen-style taijiquan and 3rd generation master of Beijing Chen style taijiquan), Chen Zhaokui's son (Chen Fake's grandson), who studied under his father's supervision starting at seven years old. Oftentimes, his style is called "Chen Taijiquan Gongfu" or "Gongfujia", since Chen Yu rebuts the idea that either his father or grandfather (i.e. Chen Fake) ever called their style "Xinjia" or believed that what they practiced was newer than other branches of Chen Taijiquan.

Chen-style Xinyi Hunyuan Taijiquan
Chen style Xinyi Hunyuan Taijiquan (陈式心意混元太极拳), called Hunyuan Taijiquan, for short, was created by Feng Zhiqiang (冯志强; 1928-2012; 10th generation master of Chen style taijiquan and 2nd generation master of Beijing Chen style taijiquan), one of Chen Fake's senior students and a student of Hu Yaozhen (胡耀貞; 1897-1993). It is much like the traditional forms of the Beijing branches of Chen-style Taijiquan with an influence from Xinyi Liuhe Quan and Qigong, learned from Hu Yaozhen and Tongbeiquan, learned in his youth. Feng, who died on 5 May 2012, was widely considered the foremost living martial artist of the Chen tradition.

"Hun Yuan" refers to the strong emphasis on circular, "orbital" or spiraling internal principles at the heart of this evolved Chen tradition. While such principles already exist in mainstream Chen-style, the Hun Yuan tradition develops the theme further. Its teaching system pays attention to spiraling techniques in both body and limbs, and how they may be harmoniously coordinated together.

Specifically, the style synthesizes Chen Taijiquan, Xinyi, and Tongbeiquan (both Qigong and, to a lesser degree, martial movements), the styles studied by Feng Zhiqiang at different times. Outwardly, it appears similar to the New Frame Chen forms and teaches beginners/seniors a 24 open-fist form as well as a 24 Qigong system.

The training syllabus also includes 35 Chen Silk-Reeling and condensed 38 and 48 open-fist forms in addition to Chen Fake's (modified) Big Frame forms (83 and 71).

The Hunyuan tradition is internationally well organized and managed by Feng's daughters and his long-time disciples. Systematic and comprehensive theory/practice international teaching conventions are held yearly. Internally trained instructors teach tai chi for health benefits with many also teaching Chen martial-art applications. Feng's specially trained "disciple instructors" teach Chen internal martial art skills of the highest level.

Grandmaster Feng in his late years rarely taught publicly but devoted his energies to training Hun Yuan instructors and an inner core of nine "disciples" that included Cao Zhilin, Chen Xiang, Pan Houcheng, Wang Fengming and Zhang Xuexin.

Han Kuiyuan (韩奎元; 1948-), who is another recognized disciple of Feng Zhiqiang (and formerly Tian Xiuchen), has been teaching Chen style Xinyi Hunyuan Taijiquan in Hungary since 1997.

Chen-style Taijiquan Practical Method
This branch of Chen Taijiquan descends through the students of Hong Junsheng (洪均生, 1907-1996), a senior student of Chen Fake, who became a disciple in 1930 and studied daily through 1944 when Hong moved to his ancestral home in Jinan, Shandong. Hong continued to practice and returned to study with Chen Fake in 1956. Modifications to the original forms taught by Chen Fake to Hong and later used in the Practical Method were made during this visit.

Hong appended the term, "Practical Method" (实用拳法, shí yòng quán fǎ), to his teaching method to emphasize the martial aspects of his study and training, as well as the harmonized training syllabus joining gōng (功) and fǎ (法) aspects of training within the Yilu (first road). Some started calling the system Hong Style Taijiquan, but Hong Junsheng objected to this designation. He claimed he was not the creator of anything. Everything he taught was Chen style Taijiquan as taught to him by his teacher, Chen Fake.

Hong taught, in traditional Chen Taijiquan, the First Path (Yilu) used the First Form, without explosive ‘’fajin’' (发劲, Send out Strength), and related foundation exercises as a curriculum focused on learning to control one's self and move in a taiji manner. Push hands was the method to learn how to use the First Form’s movements to control opponents. With these situational control skills, the Second Path (Erlu), could be learned as self-defense with the objective of injuring and disabling an attacker as quickly as possible. For this curriculum, the First Form was repurposed to include fajin and the Second Form added. Training methods also included sparring (散手, sǎn shǒu), fighting technique (拳法,) and weapons training. Today, however, Yilu and Erlu are used generally to refer to the First and Second Forms, respectively, and teachers often use Second Path skills to demonstrate martial efficacy while teaching the First Form.

In the Practical Method, there are 81 moves in the First Form and 64 moves in the Second Form, which may be joined together, not repeating the joining move, for a form of 144 moves. The sequence and names of the movements are similar to Xinjia and Beijing forms. The Second Form was reduced by naming fewer, but not deleting, moves. However, the manifested small circles and turning of the wrists characteristic of Xinjia are reduced to spirals and helices and internalized. This gives the Practical Method forms more of the look of Laojia.

Hong said Chen Fake taught, "Taijiquan is learned according to the rules (规矩, gui ju)." In this regard, theoretically, the Practical Method aligns closely with the writings of Chen Xin and, hence, Xiaojia, except that one foot is allowed to turn outward 45° so that both hips (kua, 胯) may stay open to round the crotch. Pragmatic oral instructions were passed from Chen Fake to illuminate theoretical principles, such as: Lead inward with the elbow do not lead inward with the hand; Go out with the hand do not go out with the elbow. (收肘不收手，出手不出, Shōu zhǒu bù shōu shǒu, chū shǒu bù chū zhǒu.); Only rotate don't move. (只转不动, Zhǐ zhuǎn bù dòng); Better to advance one hair than to retreat one foot. (宁进一毫，不退一尺, Níng jìn yī háo, bù tuì yī chǐ); and many others.

One innovation by Hong Junsheng for teaching movement in the form was the nomenclature, "positive" and "negative" circles. Previously, shùn chán (顺缠, following coiling) and ‘'nì chán’' (逆缠, opposing coiling) were used to describe silk-reeling (纏絲; chán sī) rotations and inward and outward arcs and circles of the extremities. This worked well for describing the longitudinal rotations of the arms and legs, but arcs and circles would often have both shun and ni rotations within them. Hong found it confusing to students to describe complete revolutions. A Positive (formerly shùn) Circle rotates inward (shùn chán) at the bottom and outward (nì chán) at the top, and a Negative (formerly nì ) Circle rotates inward (shùn chán) at the top and outward (nì chán) at the bottom. This terminology has been adopted by teachers of many styles of martial arts.

Currently, Li Enjiu is the Standard Bearer and Chen Zhonghua is International Standard bearer of Chen-style Taijiquan Practical Method. The Chen Style Taijiquan Practical Method is taught by teachers around the world.

Zhaobao Taijiquan and Chen-style Taijiquan forms
Zhaobao Village (Zhaopucun 赵堡村) lies about 2 miles (3 km) to the northeast of Chenjiagou. Since the village was a local trade center and not settled by a single family, Zhaobao Taijiquan is a true village martial art, and the style was passed master to disciples among the villagers. Village martial arts developed as skills could be brought to a village. There they were merged with prior knowledge and evolved and were taught primarily for common defense. Zhaobao taijiquan designates several lineages and traditions rather than a single one. Also, taijiquan forms from other nearby villages get grouped with Zhaobao, such as Huleijia (Sudden thunder frame), even though they are not directly related.

The villages proximity allowed residents of the Chen Village to intermarry or move to Zhaobao, so there has been an influence from Chen Taijiquan for centuries. Several Zhaobao lineages trace their roots to Jiang Fa (1574-1655), a servant to Chen Wangting (1580-1660). They claim that Jiang Fa moved to Zhaobao Village and taught taijiquan there for a number of years.

Several other notable Chen Family members also lived in Zhaobao. The best documented was Chen Qingping (1795-1868) who moved and taught there. Some Zhaobao lineages include Chen Qingping. So, Zhaobao Taijiquan shares many stylistic similarities with Chen-style taijiquan, particularly Xiaojia, because it was influenced by Chen Family stylists. His disciples, such as He Zhaoyuan and Wu Yuxiang, promoted this unique style.

Zhaobao Taijiquan is village style rather than one of the taijiquan “family” styles, and it does not originate through the teaching interaction of Chen Changxing with Yang Luchan as do other styles of taijiquan. Despite the similarities in appearance to Chen taijiquan, this style has its own theory, philosophy, and long history. It is truly a different “style" of taijiquan. Some consider it to be a distinct and separate traditional Chinese martial art altogether.

Modern Chen forms 
Similar to other family styles of taijiquan, Chen-style has had its frame adapted by competitors to fit within the framework of wushu competition. A prominent example is the 56 Chen Competition form (Developed by professor Kan Gui Xiang of the Beijing Institute of Sport under the auspice of the Chinese National Wushu Association. It is composed based on the lao jia routines (classical sets), and to a much lesser extent the 48/42 Combined Competition form (1976/1989 by the Chinese Sports Committee developed from Chen and three other traditional styles).

In the last ten years or so even respected grandmasters of traditional styles have begun to accommodate this contemporary trend towards shortened forms that take less time to learn and perform. Beginners in large cities don't always have the time, space or the concentration needed to immediately start learning old frame (75 movements). This proves all the more true at workshops given by visiting grandmasters. Consequently, shortened versions of the traditional forms have been developed even by the "Four Buddha’s warriors." Beginners can choose from postures of 38 (synthesized from both lao and xin jia by Chen Xiaowang), 19 (1995 Chen Xiaowang), 18 (Chen Zhenglei) and 13 (1997 Zhu Tiancai). There is even a 4-step routine (repeated 4 times in a circular progression, returning to start) useful for confined spaces (Zhu Tiancai).

In a sense, shorter and well composed sets of forms are modernizing tai chi to suit modern needs and lifestyle. As well as that some composers incorporated up to day medical knowledge to improve tai chi's efficacy for health and wellness.

A comprehensive list of forms, old and new, can be found here.

Weapon forms 
Chen Tai Chi has several unique weapon forms.
 the 49 posture Straight Sword (Jian) form
 the 13 posture Broadsword (Dao) form
 Spear (Qiang) solo and partner forms
 3, 8, and 13 posture Gun (staff) forms
 30 posture Halberd (Da Dao / Kwan Dao) form
 several double weapons forms utilizing the above-mentioned items

Additional training 
Before teaching the forms, the instructor may have the students do stance training such as zhan zhuang and various qigong routines such as silk reeling exercises.

Other methods of training for Chen-style using training aids including pole/spear shaking exercises, which teach a practitioner how to extend their silk reeling and fa jing skill into a weapon.

In addition to the solo exercises listed above, there are partner exercises known as pushing hands, designed to help students maintain the correct body structure when faced with resistance. There are five methods of push hands that students learn before they can move on to a more free-style push hands structure, which begins to resemble sparring.

Martial application

The vast majority of Chen stylists believe that tai chi is first and foremost a martial art; that a study of the self-defense aspect of tai chi is the best test of a student's skill and knowledge of the tai chi principles that provide health benefit. In compliance with this principle, all Chen forms retain some degree of overt fa jing expression.

In martial application, Chen-style t'ai chi ch'uan uses a wide variety of techniques applied with all the extremities that revolve around the use of the eight gates of tai chi chuan to manifest either kai (expansive power) or he (contracting power) through the physical postures of Chen forms. The particulars of exterior technique may vary between teachers and forms. In common with all neijia, Chen-style aims to develop internal power for the execution of martial techniques, but in contrast to some tai chi styles and teachers includes the cultivation of fa jing skill. Chen family member Chen Zhenglei has commented that between the new and old frame traditions there are 105 basic fajin methods and 72 basic Qinna methods present in the forms.

References

Further reading

Tai chi styles
Neijia
Articles containing video clips
16th-century introductions